Balada pro pryntsesu (A ballad about princesses) is a song of Ukrainian singer Ruslana released in 1998.

Clip 

Balada pro pryntsesu clip was the first animated videoclip in Ukraine.

Ruslana songs
1998 songs
Songs written by Ruslana
EMI Records singles